Violated Paradise, also known as Scintillating Sins and Sea Nymphs, is a 1963 Italian sexploitation film directed and produced by Marion Gering and starring Kazuko Mine. Although film contains mild nudity, it is presented more as a cultural documentary than as exploitation.

Plot
A girl from a remote village in northern Japan travels to Tokyo in the hope of becoming a geisha. On her way to the city, she sees a village where she is attracted towards a fisherman. There women work as pearl divers (amas). When she reaches the city, she decides against being a geisha and works as a hotel maid instead. In the end, the fisherman reaches the city, marries her and takes her to the village, where she works as a pearl diver.

Cast
 Kazuko Mine as Tomako
 Paulette Girard as narrator (voice)

Production
Marion Gering produced and directed the picture. Fosco Maraini and Roy M. Yaginuma were directors of photography. The English version was narrated by Tom Rowe. Marcello Abbado composed the film's music with addition scores provided by Sergio Pagoni. The film's New York premiere was held on June 7, 1963. Victoria Films and Times Film Corp. were the film's distributors. The film was based on Italian writer Fosco Maraini's work  (The Island of the Fisherwomen)
(1960). A few images shot by Maraini's crew were used in the production. It was filmed entirely in Japan and released in the United States as Diving Girls of Japan and The Diving Girls' Island.

Release and reception
This film was screened only for adults. In North Carolina, the film was shown as a double feature along with 1000 Shapes of a Female. Jasper Sharp wrote in his 2008 book Behind the pink curtain, that the film stood "as a fascinating visual document of a city in the midst of major transition". The 63-minute film was included in the DVD for The Notorious Concubines. While reviewing the feature, Douglas Pratt called the sound quality "okay" and the picture "tolerable". The Realist critic called the film a "short bore". DVD Verdict called it a combination of National Geographic and native Japanese styles and "awash with scrapes, dirt, and highly irritating editing jumps".

References

External links
 
 
 

1963 films
American sexploitation films
Films shot in Japan
1963 drama films
1963 documentary films
Films about geisha
Italian documentary films
Japan in non-Japanese culture
Travelogues
1960s English-language films
1960s American films
1960s Italian films